The 1987 Ball State Cardinals football team was an American football team that represented Ball State University in the Mid-American Conference (MAC) during the 1987 NCAA Division I-A football season. In its third season under head coach Paul Schudel, the team compiled an 4–7 record (3–5 against conference opponents) and finished in eighth place out of nine teams in the MAC. The team played its home games at Ball State Stadium in Muncie, Indiana.

The team's statistical leaders included Wade Kosakowski with 1,477 passing yards, Bernie Parmalee with 1,064 rushing yards and 90 points scored, and Deon Chester with 838 receiving yards.

Schedule

References

Ball State
Ball State Cardinals football seasons
Ball State Cardinals football